Peter Howard Haynes  (born 23 July 1958) is a British applied mathematician in the Faculty of Mathematics at the University of Cambridge.  He is a Fellow of Queens' College, Cambridge and served as Head of the Department of Applied Mathematics and Theoretical Physics (DAMTP) from 2005 to 2015.

He was educated at the Royal Grammar School, Guildford, and Queens' College, Cambridge (B.A. 1979, M.A. 1983, Ph.D. 1984).

Research
His research includes fluid dynamics and atmospheric dynamics.

References

Living people
20th-century British mathematicians
21st-century British mathematicians
Fluid dynamicists
Cambridge mathematicians
Fellows of Queens' College, Cambridge
1958 births
People educated at Royal Grammar School, Guildford
Alumni of Queens' College, Cambridge